The following is a list of awards and nominations received by American actor Jeff Bridges. He has received various awards throughout his career spanning over seven decades, including an Academy Award, two Golden Globe Awards, a Screen Actors Guild Award, and two Independent Spirit Awards. In 2019 he received the Golden Globe Cecil B. DeMille Award. 

He soon gained attention for his role in the Peter Bogdanovich drama The Last Picture Show (1971) earning his first Academy Award nomination. He cemented himself as a leading man earning Oscar nominations for Thunderbolt and Lightfoot (1974), Starman (1984), The Contender (2000), True Grit (2010), and Hell or High Water (2016). He received the Academy Award for Best Actor for his role as an alcoholic singer in Crazy Heart (2009). 

Bridge's is also known for his work on television receiving a Primetime Emmy Award for Outstanding Lead Actor in a Limited Series or Movie for his role in the HBO movie A Dog Year (2009).

Major associations

Academy Awards

British Academy Film Awards

Golden Globe Awards

Primetime Emmy Awards

Screen Actors Guild Awards

Miscellaneous awards

Gotham Awards

Independent Spirit Awards

Saturn Awards

Satellite Awards

Teen Choice Awards

Critic associations

References

Bridges, Jeff